Sredniye Lubyanki is a rural locality (a selo) in Volokonovsky District, Belgorod Oblast, Russia. The population was 211 as of 2010. There are 6 streets.

Geography 
Sredniye Lubyanki is located 8 km southwest of Volokonovka (the district's administrative centre) by road. Pyatnitskoye is the nearest rural locality.

References 

Rural localities in Volokonovsky District